National Route 407 (N407) forms part of the Philippine highway network. It runs from Batangas to Cavite.

Route description

Calaca to Nasugbu 

N407 starts at the intersection with N410 (Tagaytay–Nasugbu Highway and Diokno Highway) in Calaca, Batangas, near the provincial boundary of Cavite and Batangas. To the west, then traverses Nasugbu, Tuy (where it turns east at Palico Junction, its intersection with N427 (Palico–Balayan–Batangas Road)), and Nasugbu once again.

Nasugbu to Ternate 

N407 turns north and takes the entire Ternate–Nasugbu Road from its intersection with N408 (Nasugbu–Lian–Calatagan) in Nasugbu. It then enters Cavite at Maragondon and Ternate, where it terminates at N405 (Caylabne Road and Governor's Drive).

References

External links 
 Department of Public Works and Highways

Roads in Cavite
Roads in Batangas